1 South African Infantry Battalion is a mechanized infantry unit of the South African Army.

History

Oudtshoorn origin
Established as 1 SA Infantry Training Battalion at Oudtshoorn, (hence the ostrich feathers on the unit insignia) on 26 January 1951, the unit became part of the infantry corps with its establishment in January 1951.

In 1953, the unit consisted of:

 a headquarters with companies at: 
 1 SAI itself in Oudsthoorn as A Company, 
 1 SSB in Bloemfontein as B Company;
 4 Field Regiment in Potchefstroom as C Company;
and 
a supply & transport company, an attempt at all arms training.

The unit was reconstituted as 1 SA Infantry Battalion in November 1967 and moved to its current base at Tempe near Bloemfontein, in November 1973.

1 SAI in the development of modern mechanised infantry
By 1976 infantry operations transformed drastically when the Ratel Infantry Fighting Vehicle (IFV) was introduced for the first time and in November the first Ratel course was presented at 1 SAI by then Major Roland de Vries.

In 1977, 1 SAI received its first consignment of 42 Ratel IFVs. The shoulder flash of 1 SAI was redesigned depicting a rampant honey badger, while the first mechanised infantry junior leadership training courses started.

From 1977 to 1981, mechanised infantry leadership students shared the same lines as 1 SAIs conventional companies, but were required to wear a nutria brassard on the right arm with a green and yellow embroidered honey badger insignia in order to stand out and ensure Espirit de Corps. The training wing became identified as the T&D Wing and all students attended the same course until the Section Leaders Phase had been completed. Section Leaders were then awarded their Lance Corporal stripes and then placed with regular rifle companies. The rest of the future NCOs also received their stripes and future Officers received their white Candidate Officer's tabs. These students were then evaluated and split into the Mechanised Platoon Commanders Course and Specialist Instructors Course. These platoon commanders were destined to either become future leaders of 1 SAIs rifle companies or instructors at the Training Wing, while the Specialist Instructors would become Officers and NCO's responsible for training of Ratel gunners and drivers.  
All students qualifying as Section Leaders were authorised to wear one parallel green bar above their two Corporal stripes. 
Students that qualified as Platoon NCOs were authorised to wear two parallel green bars. The Platoon NCOs were responsible for the support of the vehicles, platoon weapons and signal equipment of a specific platoon. 
Students that completed either the Platoon Commanders or Specialist Instructors Course were permitted to wear three parallel green bars above their stripes, signifying their platoon sergeant status. Platoon sergeants were responsible for the training and discipline of an allocated platoon.

By January 1981, the training wing was renamed the Mechanised Leadership Wing and moved to the Akkedisdorp premises outside the lines of 1 SAI and next to 1 SSB. The wearing of the distinctive honey badger student brassard was discontinued during this period.

The mechanised techniques developed at 1 SAI was transferred to two additional mechanised infantry battalions under development at that time, namely 4 SAI and 8 SAI.

Battalion Pioneer Platoon
1 SAI also had an assault pioneer capability in the 1980s, usually designated Oscar Company. Assault pioneers were the integral combat engineering component of the battalion. Assault pioneers were trained in tasks such as:
Field defences and obstacles
Mine detection and removal
 Primary demolitions
Non standard bridging
 Anchorages and suspension traverses
The Pioneer Platoon provided small tasks and close support capabilities to the battalion ensuring immediacy of response and decreasing the workload of the engineer squadrons. By the 1990s this function was retired to the Engineering Corps however.

Bushwar

Operations
By 1978, 1 SAI took part in Operation Reindeer. 1 SAI was also later involved in:
Sceptic, 
Protea, 
Daisy, 
Askari  
Moduler and
Operation Hooper.

Honouris Crux recipients
The following 1 SAI members were awarded the Honoris Crux decoration

Operation Sceptic;
 Lt. J.J. du Toit 
 LCpl A.T. Rutherford

Operation Protea;
 Cpl A.D. Burgers

Relationship with 61 Mech
1 SAI was also the main feeder unit for mechanised infantry companies for 61 Mechanised Battalion Group during this period.

Post 1994

Assimilation of 151 Battalion
Peled writes that after January 1993, 151 Battalion, formed from the Southern Sothos in the Orange Free area, was assimilated into 1 SAI.

Murder at 1 SAI

In Sept 1999, a disgruntled junior officer from 1 SAI went on a shooting spree through the unit. Lt. S. Madubela  killed seven personnel and injured five. He was stopped and killed by his colleagues.

Freedom of Entry
1 SAI received the freedom of entry to Bloemfontein in 1981.

Insignia

Previous Dress Insignia

Current Dress Insignia

Ordnance

Current

Vehicle mounted weapons
1 SAI is equipped with Ratel 20 Infantry Fighting Vehicles, Ratel  Mortar Platform Vehicles, Ratel Command Vehicles with mounted  machine guns, Kwevoel 100 Armoured Trucks for IFV Recovery, field maintenance, fuel bunkers and water provision, Samil 50 and 100 logistics trucks, Samil 20 trucks for its organic field workshops, Casspir APCs for its forward artillery observation party, and Rinkhals Field Ambulance. 1 SAI has also used Buffel IFVs and Mambas at certain stages in its history. Ratel mounted weapons include the Denel Land Systems GI-2  Quick Firing Cannon (QFC) (Ratel mounted),  breech-loading mortar (Ratel mounted), Browning M1919  Machine gun and the Browning M2  Machine gun.

Lighter and personal weapons
1 SAI is equipped with the Vektor SS77 Squad Automatic Machine gun, Fabrique Nationale  Light Machine gun, Vektor R4  assault rifle,  Multiple Grenade Launcher (MGL), Rocket Propelled grenade launcher (RPG-7), M26 Fragmentation grenade, M4  patrol mortar (PATMOR), and the Denel  FT5 rocket launcher.

Future
Under Project Hoefyster, the SANDF will eventually replace the Ratel family of vehicles with the Badger system.
Nine versions are contemplated of which three are earmarked for mechanized Infantry Battalions such as 1 SAI:
 Command       (mech infantry) 
 Mortar (turreted 60mm breech loading long-range mortar) ( mech infantry)
 Missile (turreted Denel ZT3 Ingwe)
 Section (turreted 30mm cannon)   (mech infantry)
 Fire Support (turreted 30mm cannon, but with more ammunition than the section vehicle)
 Signal variant
 Ambulance variant
 Artillery variant

1 SAI Mechanised Fleet early 1990s

Fighting Echelon Vehicles

1 Ratel 20 per section, 3 sections per platoon, 1 Ratel 60 per platoon, 3 platoons per company. 2 Ratel 12,7 per company.

A Echelon Vehicles

Unit Song
From the shores of Cape Agulhas,
to the Northern bushveld trees,
We will fight our countries battles, 
in the air, land and sea,
We will fight for right and freedom, 
we will keep our honesty,
We are proud to claim the title of the 'Mechanised Infantry'.

Leadership

Training Battalion

Mechanised Leadership Wing

Notes

References

Infantry battalions of South Africa
Infantry regiments of South Africa
Military units and formations in Bloemfontein
Military units and formations of South Africa in the Border War
Military units and formations established in 1951
1951 establishments in South Africa